The Red Cliffs Utah Temple is a temple under construction of the Church of Jesus Christ of Latter-day Saints in St. George, Utah. The intent to build the temple was announced by church president Russell M. Nelson during the October 2018 general conference of the church under the name Washington County Utah Temple.

The location for the temple was announced in November 2019. Plans called for a three story temple of 90,000 square feet, in the Washington Fields area of southeastern St. George. A small groundbreaking for the temple took place a year later, with attendance being limited due to the COVID-19 pandemic. A church apostle, Elder Jeffrey R. Holland, presided at the groundbreaking. The temple is to become the 2nd temple of the church to be built in St. George and the 20th in Utah. The first temple built in the city, the St. George Utah Temple, was built in 1877 on the eastern side of I-15. An Angel Moroni statue, frequently placed atop of temples of the church, was installed in May of 2022.

See also

 The Church of Jesus Christ of Latter-day Saints in Utah
 Comparison of temples of The Church of Jesus Christ of Latter-day Saints
 List of temples of The Church of Jesus Christ of Latter-day Saints
 List of temples of The Church of Jesus Christ of Latter-day Saints by geographic region
 Temple architecture (Latter-day Saints)

References

External links
 Red Cliffs Utah Temple Official site
 Provo Utah Temple at ChurchofJesusChristTemples.org

21st-century Latter Day Saint temples
Temples (LDS Church) in Utah